The men's javelin throw at the 1969 European Athletics Championships was held in Athens, Greece, at Georgios Karaiskakis Stadium on 19 September 1969.

Medalists

Results

Final
19 September

Participation
According to an unofficial count, 13 athletes from 8 countries participated in the event.

 (1)
 (3)
 (1)
 (1)
 (1)
 (3)
 (2)
 (1)

References

Javelin throw
Javelin throw at the European Athletics Championships